The Men's time trial at the 2006 UCI Road World Championships took place on September 21, 2006, in the Austrian city of Salzburg. The race was part of the UCI Road World Championships. Swiss rider Fabian Cancellara won the gold medal and the rainbow jersey as the 2006 World Time Trial Champion.

Final classification

Selected Riders

Each National Federation was allowed to enter 2 riders. In the end 53 riders were selected for the race, with Polish rider Piotr Mazur not starting, 52 riders effectively took part.

References

External links
Race website
cyclingnews

Men's Time Trial
UCI Road World Championships – Men's time trial